Tayr Harfa  is a village in Tyre District in Southern Lebanon, located 16 kilometres south of Tyre.

Name
According to E. H. Palmer, the name means "The fortress of Harfa".

History
In 1852,  during the late Ottoman era, Edward Robinson noted  it on his travels in the region.

In 1875,   Victor Guérin found here 200 Metuali inhabitants.

In 1881, the PEF's Survey of Western Palestine (SWP) described it: "A stone and mud village, containing about 200 Moslems, on a hill, with olives, figs, and arable land, and waste ground covered with brushwood. Water from cisterns."

References

Bibliography

External links
 Tayr Harfa, Localiban
Survey of Western Palestine, Map 3:  IAA, Wikimedia commons 

Populated places in the Israeli security zone 1985–2000
Populated places in Tyre District
Shia Muslim communities in Lebanon